Brumunddal Station is a railway station in Brumunddal in Ringsaker, Norway, on Dovrebanen. The station was opened in 1894 with the construction of the railway between Hamar and Tretten. Brumunddal is only served by regional trains by Vy and night trains by SJ Norge.

External links 

Railway stations on the Dovre Line
Railway stations in Hedmark
Railway stations opened in 1894
1894 establishments in Norway
Ringsaker